Capital punishment is a legal penalty in the United Arab Emirates.

Under Emirati law, multiple crimes carry the death penalty, and executions are usually carried out through 
a firing squad.  Current law allows the death penalty for treason, espionage, murder, successfully inciting the suicide of a person "afflicted with total lack of free will or reason", arson resulting in death, acts of indecent assault resulting in death, apostasy, rape, perjury causing wrongful execution, aggravated robbery, terrorism, sodomy, homosexuality, drug trafficking and joining the Islamic State of Iraq and the Levant. Overseas nationals and UAE nationals have both been executed for crimes.

Stoning
The United Arab Emirates has sentenced several people to death by stoning. In 2010, stoning to death was prescribed as the default method of execution for adultery, and it remained a legal punishment under the UAE's interpretation of Sharia in 2021.

In general, the sentence is not carried out. Although Karteen Karikender was sentenced thus in 2000, she was released before January 2001 and allowed to return home to her family in Indonesia.  Shahin Abdul Rahman was also sentenced to death by stoning in 2006 in Fujairah for adultery by a Sharia court.  This sentence was commuted to one year's imprisonment and deportation. Sentences of stoning are rare in the UAE and there is no evidence of any that have been carried out.

Notable cases
In 1995, Sarah Balabagan, a Filipino worker, caught the attention of many people living in the UAE. She was reported to have murdered her employer in his Al Ain house, although she has always maintained that she only killed him in self-defence after he tried to rape her. After the UAE president himself got involved, Balabagan was set free and had to pay compensation instead. However, she was deported back to her country and her right to remain in the country was cancelled.

On February 10, 2011, Rashid Al Rashidi was executed by firing squad. He was convicted of raping and murdering a four-year-old boy, Moosa Mukhtiar, in the toilets of a mosque on November 27, 2009.

On January 21, 2014, a Sri Lankan national was executed after being convicted of killing an Emirati businessman by mowing him down with his car. 

In June 2015, the Federal Supreme Court sentenced an Emirati terrorist woman, Alaa Bader al-Hashemi, to death for the murder of Ibolya Ryan and planting a "handmade bomb" in an Egyptian-American doctor's home in Abu Dhabi. The woman committed the crime in December 2014 and was executed at dawn on July 13, 2015. This is the only time that a prisoner has been executed within such a short time frame and this is one of the few cases of a woman being executed.

On November 23, 2017, Nidal Eisa Abdullah, a man who raped and killed an eight-year-old boy in May 2016, was executed.

On April 5, 2022 an Israeli woman was sentenced to death in Abu Dhabi for drug smuggling. Her sentence was later overturned by an appeals court and commuted to life imprisonment.

See also 
Crime in the United Arab Emirates
Legal system of the United Arab Emirates

References

External links
Death Penalty Worldwide: United Arab Emirates
 

United Arab Emirates
Murder in the United Arab Emirates
Law of the United Arab Emirates
Human rights abuses in the United Arab Emirates